Ingrid Hall (née De Meyer) is a former association football player who represented New Zealand at international level.

Hall made her Football Ferns debut in a 0–0 draw with Australia on 8 October 1979, and finished her international career with 17 caps and 1 goal to her credit.

References

Year of birth missing (living people)
Living people
New Zealand women's international footballers
New Zealand women's association footballers
Women's association footballers not categorized by position